The History of Science Society (HSS) is the primary professional society for the academic study of the history of science. It was founded in 1924 by George Sarton, David Eugene Smith, and Lawrence Joseph Henderson, primarily to support the publication of Isis, a journal of the history of science Sarton had started in 1912.<ref name="Rossiter">{{cite book|last=Rossiter|first=Margaret W.|author-link=Margaret Rossiter|title=Catching Up with the Vision: Essays on the Occasion of the 75th Anniversary of the Founding of the History of Science Society|date=1999|publisher=University of Chicago Press for the History of Science Society|location=Chicago, Ill.}}</ref> The society has over 3,000 members worldwide. It continues to publish the quarterly journal Isis, the yearly Osiris, sponsors the IsisCB: History of Science Index, and holds an annual conference.

, the current president of the HSS is Fa-ti Fan.
Awards and recognition
HSS sponsors two special lectures annually:
 The George Sarton Memorial Lecture, delivered at the Annual Meeting of the American Association for the Advancement of Science since 1960 (with a break from 1973 to 1975)
 The History of Science Society Distinguished Lecture (formerly the History of Science Society Lecture), delivered at a plenary session of the annual meeting of the HSS since 1981

In addition, the HSS awards a number of prizes:

 The Suzanne J. Levinson Prize, established in 2006, is awarded biennially for a book in the history of the life sciences and natural history
 The Nathan Reingold Prize (formerly the Schuman Prize), established in 1955, for an outstanding essay in the history of science written by a graduate student
 The Derek Price/Rod Webster Prize (formerly the Zeitlin-Ver Brugge Prize), established in 1978, for an outstanding article in Isis''
 The Margaret W. Rossiter History of Women in Science Prize, first awarded in 1987, for an outstanding work on the subject of women in science (the prize alternates annually between books and journals)
 The Joseph H. Hazen Education Prize, established in 1998, for outstanding contributions to teaching history of science
 The Watson Davis and Helen Miles Davis Prize, established in 1985, for a textbook or popular book on the history of science
 The Pfizer Award, established in 1958, for an outstanding book in the history of science (a medal accompanies this award)
 The George Sarton Medal, first awarded in 1955, for lifetime achievement in the history of science

See also 
 International Academy of the History of Science

References

External links

IsisCB Explore: History of Science Index An open access discovery service for the history of science
History of Science Society, Publications, 1989-1999 from the Smithsonian Institution Archives

Organizations established in 1924
History of science organizations
Non-profit organizations based in Indiana
Historical societies of the United States
University of Notre Dame
Science and technology studies associations
1924 establishments in the United States